Beetley may refer to:

Beetley, village and civil parish in the Breckland district of Norfolk, England
Samuel E. Beetley (1913-1988), American film editor